Frederick Barne (8 November 1805 – 9 March 1886) was an English landowner and politician who sat in the House of Commons from 1830 to 1832.

Barne was the only son of Lieutenant-Colonel Michael Barne and Mary Boucherett, daughter of Ayscoghe Boucherett. He served as a captain in the 12th Royal Lancers. In 1830 he was elected Member of Parliament for the rotten borough of Dunwich, the previous MP being his father. He held the seat until 1832 when it was abolished under the 1832 Reform Act. He lived at Sotterley HalI and was High Sheriff of Suffolk in 1851.

In 1834, Barne married Mary Anne Elizabeth Honywood, eldest  daughter of Sir John Courtenay Honywood, 5th Baronet. Their son Frederick St John Barne was later Member of Parliament for East Suffolk.

References

External links 

 

1801 births
1886 deaths
Members of the Parliament of the United Kingdom for English constituencies
UK MPs 1830–1831
UK MPs 1831–1832
High Sheriffs of Suffolk
19th-century English landowners
Frederick